1,3,5-Trimethyl-1,3,5-triazinane is an organic compound with the formula (CHNCH).  It is a colorless liquid that is soluble in many organic solvents.  Structurally, it is one of several related hexahydro-1,3,5-triazines, which typically result from the condensation reaction of amines and formaldehyde.

It undergoes deprotonation by butyllithium to give a reagent that serves as a source of the formyl anion.

References

Amines
Triazines